The Hungary national handball team is administered by the Hungarian Handball Federation.

Competitive record
 Champions   Runners-up   Third place   Fourth place

Olympic Games

Competitive record at the Olympic Games

Competitive record in pre-Olympic qualifying rounds

World Championship

Competitive record at the World Championship

Competitive record in pre-World Championship qualifying rounds

European Championship

Competitive record at the European Championship

Competitive record in pre-European Championship qualifying rounds

*Denotes draws include knockout matches decided on penalties.
**Gold background color indicates that the tournament was won. Red border color indicates tournament was held on home soil.

Team

Current squad
Squad for the 2023 World Men's Handball Championship.

Head coach: Chema Rodríguez

Past squads
1936 Olympic Games (4th place)
Antal Benda, Ferenc Cziráki, Sándor Cséfai, Miklós Fodor, Lőrinc Galgóczi, János Koppány, Lajos Kutasi, Tibor Máté, Imre Páli, Ferenc Rákosi, Endre Salgó, István Serényi, Sándor Szomori, Gyula Takács, Antal Újváry, Ferenc Velkey.

1958 World Championship (7th place)
Jenő Balázs, István Bányai, Ottó Bencsik, József Berendi, Rudolf Bolla, Mihály Faludi, Sándor Fekete, Ottó Hetényi, Jenő Horváth, Miklós Kele, Tibor Kőszegi, Gábor Lengyel, Béla Schvajda, Ferenc Som, Károly Töltő, István Vajna.
Coach: Sándor Cséfai

1964 World Championship (8th place)
János Adorján, Gyula Baranyai, Ferenc Berkesi, Vilmos Drobnits, Dénes Dubán, András Fenyő, András Kesjár, József Klein, János Kovács, László Kovács, István Marosi, Béla Rácz, László Stiller, Sándor Tamásdi, Béla Tímár, Ferenc Vígh.
Coach: Árpád Csicsmányi

1967 World Championship (8th place)
János Adorján, András Fenyő, Ferenc Gyűrű, Sándor Kaló, József Klein, Ádám Koch, János Kovács, László Kovács, István Marosi, Attila Nagy, Lajos Simó, Béla Tímár, János Tornóczky, István Varga.
Coach: Miklós Albrecht

1970 World Championship (8th place)
János Adorján, János Csík, András Fenyő, József Horváth, Sándor Kaló, László Kovács, István Marosi, Lajos Simó, János Stiller, István Szabó, László Szabó, Sándor Takács, István Varga, Sándor Vass.
Coach: Miklós Albrecht

1972 Olympic Games (8th place)
János Adorján, Béla Bartalos, János Csík, László Harka, József Horváth, Sándor Kaló, István Marosi, Lajos Simó, János Stiller, István Szabó, László Szabó, Sándor Takács, István Varga, Károly Vass, Sándor Vass.
Coach: Miklós Albrecht

1974 World Championship (7th place)
Béla Bartalos, Ferenc Buday, Ferenc Demjén, Ernő Gubányi, József Horváth, János Hunyadkürti, Pál Kocsis, Péter Kovács, Lajos Simó, János Stiller, István Szilágyi, Károly Vass, Sándor Vass, Titusz Zuber.
Coach: Mihály Faludi

1976 Olympic Games (6th place)
Béla Bartalos, Ferenc Buday, Ernő Gubányi, László Jánovszki, József Kenyeres, Zsolt Kontra, Péter Kovács, Mihály Süvöltős, István Szilágyi, István Varga, Károly Vass, Gábor Verőci.
Coach: Mihály Faludi

1978 World Championship (9th place)
Béla Bartalos, Ferenc Buday, Ernő Gubányi, László Jánovszki, József Kenyeres, Pál Kocsis, Zsolt Kontra, Péter Kovács, Gyula Molnár, Mihály Süvöltős, László Szabó, István Szilágyi, Zoltán Várkonyi, Gábor Verőci.
Coach: Mihály Faludi

1980 Olympic Games (4th place)
Béla Bartalos, János Fodor, Ernő Gubányi, László Jánovszki, Alpár Jegenyés, József Kenyeres, Zsolt Kontra, Miklós Kovacsics, Péter Kovács, Ambrus Lele, Árpád Pál, László Szabó, István Szilágyi, Sándor Vass.
Coach: Mihály Faludi

1982 World Championship (9th place)
Béla Bartalos, János Gyurka, László Hoffmann, Gábor Horváth, Alpár Jegenyés, József Kenyeres, Pál Kocsis, Zsolt Kontra, Mihály Kovács, Péter Kovács, Ambrus Lele, László Szabó, István Szilágyi, Géza Tóth, Károly Vass.
Coach: Mihály Faludi

1986 World Championship (runners-up)
Imre Bíró, József Bordás, Viktor Debre, János Fodor, János Gyurka, László Hoffmann, Gábor Horváth, Mihály Iváncsik, József Kenyeres, Zsolt Kontra, Mihály Kovács, Péter Kovács, László Marosi, László Szabó, Tibor Oross.
Coach: Lajos Mocsai

1988 Olympic Games (4th place)
Imre Bíró, József Bordás, Ottó Csicsay, János Fodor, János Gyurka, László Hoffmann, Mihály Iváncsik, Mihály Kovács, Péter Kovács, László Marosi, Tibor Oross, Jakab Sibalin, László Szabó, Géza Tóth.
Coach: Lajos Mocsai

1990 World Championship (6th place)
Imre Bíró, József Bordás, Attila Borsos, Ferenc Füzesi, Sándor Győrffy, János Gyurka, László Hoffmann, Mihály Iváncsik, Mihály Kovács, Géza Lehel, László Marosi, István Pribék, Jenő Putics, Jakab Sibalin.
Coach: János Csík

1992 Olympic Games (7th place)
Imre Bíró, Attila Borsos, Ottó Csicsay, István Csoknyai, József Éles, Ferenc Füzesi, Sándor Győrffy, Attila Horváth, Mihály Iváncsik, László Marosi, Richárd Mezei, Jakab Sibalin, László Sótonyi, János Szathmári, Igor Zubjuk.
Coach: Attila Joósz

1993 World Championship (11th place)
Csaba Bartók, Imre Bíró, Attila Borsos, István Csoknyai, József Éles, Róbert Fekete, Kálmán Fenyő, Sándor Győrffy, János Gyurka, Attila Horváth, Balázs Kertész, Richárd Mezei, Árpád Mohácsi, István Pásztor, László Sótonyi, János Szathmári.
Coach: László Kovács

1994 European Championship (7th place)
Csaba Bartók, Attila Borsos, István Csoknyai, József Éles, Róbert Fekete, István Gulyás, Balázs Kertész, István Kiss, Richárd Mezei, Zoltán Németh, István Pásztor, Zsolt Perger, László Sótonyi, János Szathmári, György Zsigmond.
Coach: Sándor Kaló

1995 World Championship (17–20th place)
Attila Borsos, József Éles, Róbert Fekete, István Gulyás, István Kiss, Attila Kotormán, Péter Kovács, Árpád Mohácsi, Zsolt Perger, István Rosta, Miklós Rosta, László Sótonyi, János Szathmári, Lajos Török, Igor Zubjuk, György Zsigmond.
Coach: Sándor Kaló

1996 European Championship (10th place)
Csaba Bartók, Csaba Bendó, Péter Borsodi, István Csoknyai, Róbert Fekete, Ákos Kis, Attila Kotormán, Rudolf Kubasi, Richárd Mezei, Zoltán Nagy, András Oszlánczi, István Pásztor, László Sótonyi, János Szathmári, István Szotyori, György Zsigmond.
Coach: Árpád Kővári

1997 World Championship (4th place)
Csaba Bendó, Zoltán Bergendi, István Csoknyai, József Éles, István Gulyás, Balázs Kertész, Ákos Kis, Richárd Mezei, István Pásztor, Zsolt Perger, Miklós Rosta, László Sótonyi, János Szathmári, Tibor Tyetyák, Igor Zubjuk, György Zsigmond.
Coach: Sándor Vass

1998 European Championship (6th place)
Csaba Bartók, István Csoknyai, Róbert Fekete, István Gulyás, Balázs Kertész, Ákos Kis, Attila Kotormán, Richárd Mezei, István Pásztor, Miklós Rosta, László Sótonyi, János Szathmári, György Zsigmond.
Coach: Sándor Vass

1999 World Championship (11th place)
Csaba Bendó, Tamás Bene, István Csoknyai, Gábor Décsi, József Éles, Nándor Fazekas, István Gulyás, Balázs Kertész, Ákos Kis, Attila Kotormán, Richárd Mezei, László Nagy, Zsolt Perger, István Rosta, László Sótonyi, János Szathmári.
Coach: Sándor Vass

2003 World Championship (6th place)
Csaba Bendó, Dániel Buday, Ákos Doros, Nándor Fazekas, Gyula Gál, Gergő Iváncsik, Máté Józsa, Dávid Katzirz, Balázs Kertész, Balázs Laluska, Péter Lendvay, László Nagy, István Pásztor (captain), Carlos Pérez, Miklós Rosta, János Szathmári.
Coach: László Skaliczki

2004 European Championship (9th place)
Dániel Buday, Gábor Császár, Ivo Díaz, Nándor Fazekas, Gyula Gál, Ferenc Ilyés, Gergő Iváncsik, Balázs Kertész, Balázs Laluska, Richárd Mezei, Tamás Mocsai, Árpád Mohácsi, László Nagy, István Pásztor (captain), Miklós Rosta, János Szathmári.
Coach: László Skaliczki

2004 Olympic Games (4th place)
Gábor Császár, Ivo Díaz, Nándor Fazekas, Gyula Gál, Gergely Harsányi, Ferenc Ilyés, Gergő Iváncsik, Balázs Laluska, Péter Lendvay, Richárd Mezei, Tamás Mocsai, László Nagy, István Pásztor (captain), Carlos Pérez, János Szathmári.
Coach: László Skaliczki

2006 European Championship (13th place)
Dániel Buday, Gábor Császár, Nándor Fazekas, Gyula Gál, Gergely Harsányi, Ferenc Ilyés, Gergő Iváncsik, Tamás Iváncsik, Máté Józsa, Balázs Laluska, Péter Lendvay, Roland Mikler, László Nagy (captain), Gábor Szente, Szabolcs Törő, Szabolcs Zubai.
Coach: László Skaliczki

2007 World Championship (9th place)
Gábor Császár, Ivo Díaz, Nándor Fazekas, Gyula Gál, Gábor Herbert, Ferenc Ilyés, Gergő Iváncsik, Tamás Iváncsik, Dávid Katzirz, Tamás Mocsai, László Nagy (captain), Kornél Nagy, Nenad Puljezevics, Péter Tatai, Csaba Tombor, Attila Vadkerti.
Coach: László Skaliczki

2008 European Championship (8th place)
Gábor Császár, Nikola Eklemovics, Nándor Fazekas, Gyula Gál, Gábor Grebenár, Péter Gulyás, Gábor Herbert, Ferenc Ilyés, Gergő Iváncsik, Tamás Iváncsik, Balázs Laluska, Tamás Mocsai, Kornél Nagy, László Nagy (captain), Nenad Puljezevics, Szabolcs Törő, Szabolcs Zubai.
Coach: László Skaliczki

2009 World Championship (6th place)
Gábor Császár, Nikola Eklemovics, Nándor Fazekas, Gyula Gál, Gergely Harsányi, Gábor Herbert, Ferenc Ilyés, Gergő Iváncsik, Tamás Iváncsik, Dávid Katzirz, Tamás Mocsai, László Nagy (captain), Nenad Puljezevics, Barna Putics, Szabolcs Törő, Szabolcs Zubai.
Coach: János Hajdu

2010 European Championship (14th place)
Gábor Császár, Nikola Eklemovics, Nándor Fazekas, Gyula Gál (captain), Péter Gulyás, Ferenc Ilyés, Gergő Iváncsik, Tamás Iváncsik, Dávid Katzirz, Milorad Krivokapić, Balázs Laluska, Kornél Nagy, Nenad Puljezevics, Timuzsin Schuch, Szabolcs Törő, Szabolcs Zubai.
Coach: István Csoknyai

2011 World Championship (7th place)
Gábor Császár, Nándor Fazekas, Gyula Gál (captain), Péter Gulyás, Gergely Harsányi, Ferenc Ilyés, Gergő Iváncsik, Tamás Iváncsik, Dávid Katzirz, Máté Lékai, Roland Mikler, Tamás Mocsai, Kornél Nagy, Carlos Pérez, Timuzsin Schuch, Szabolcs Törő, Szabolcs Zubai.
Coach: Lajos Mocsai

2012 European Championship (8th place)
Gábor Ancsin, Gábor Császár, Nándor Fazekas, Gergely Harsányi, Ferenc Ilyés (captain), Gergő Iváncsik, Tamás Iváncsik, Milorad Krivokapić, Balázs Laluska, Roland Mikler, Tamás Mocsai, Kornél Nagy, Barna Putics, Timuzsin Schuch, Szabolcs Szöllősi, Attila Vadkerti, Szabolcs Zubai.
Coach: Lajos Mocsai

2012 Olympic Games (4th place)
Gábor Császár, Nándor Fazekas, Péter Gulyás, Gergely Harsányi, Ferenc Ilyés (captain), Gergő Iváncsik, Balázs Laluska, Máté Lékai, Roland Mikler, Tamás Mocsai, László Nagy, Carlos Pérez, Barna Putics, Timuzsin Schuch, Attila Vadkerti, Szabolcs Zubai.
Coach: Lajos Mocsai

2013 World Championship (8th place)
Gábor Ancsin, Gábor Császár, Gergely Harsányi (captain), Gergő Iváncsik, Milorad Krivokapić, Máté Lékai, Roland Mikler, Tamás Mocsai, Kornél Nagy, László Nagy, Barna Putics, Timuzsin Schuch, Szabolcs Szöllősi, Péter Tatai, Attila Vadkerti, Szabolcs Zubai.
Coach: Lajos Mocsai

2014 European Championship (8th place)
Gábor Ancsin, Gábor Császár, Péter Gulyás, Ferenc Ilyés (captain), Gergő Iváncsik, Máté Lékai, Roland Mikler, Tamás Mocsai, Kornél Nagy, Barna Putics, Gábor Szalafai, Timuzsin Schuch, Szabolcs Szöllősi, Péter Tatai, Attila Vadkerti, Bence Zdolik, Szabolcs Zubai.
Coach: Lajos Mocsai

2016 European Championship (12th place)
Gábor Ancsin, Bence Bánhidi, László Bartucz, Richárd Bodó, Tamás Borsos, Rudolf Faluvégi, Tibor Gazdag, Péter Hornyák, Gergő Iváncsik, Iman Jamali, Roland Mikler, Kornél Nagy, László Nagy (captain), Ákos Pásztor, Timuzsin Schuch, Szabolcs Zubai.
Coach: Talant Duyshebaev

2017 World Championship (7th place)
Gábor Ancsin, Zsolt Balogh, Bence Bánhidi, Richárd Bodó, Gábor Császár, Nándor Fazekas, Péter Gulyás, Gergely Harsányi, Iman Jamali, Ádám Juhász, Máté Lékai, Patrik Ligetvári, Roland Mikler, László Nagy (captain), Szabolcs Szöllősi, Timuzsin Schuch, Szabolcs Zubai.
Coach: Xavi Sabaté

2018 European Championship (14th place)
Gábor Ancsin, Zsolt Balogh, Donát Bartók, Bence Bánhidi, Richárd Bodó, Ádám Borbély, Gábor Császár, Dávid Fekete, Péter Hornyák, Iman Jamali, Ádám Juhász, Máté Lékai, Patrik Ligetvári, Roland Mikler, Ádám Országh, Szabolcs Szöllősi, Timuzsin Schuch (captain), Uroš Vilovski.
Coach: Ljubomir Vranjes

2019 World Championship (10th place)
Gábor Ancsin, Zsolt Balogh, Bence Bánhidi, Richárd Bodó, Bendegúz Bóka, Gábor Császár, Péter Hornyák, Ferenc Ilyés (captain), Iman Jamali, Ádám Juhász, Máté Lékai, Patrik Ligetvári, Dominik Máthé, Roland Mikler, László Nagy, Timuzsin Schuch, Adrián Sipos, Márton Székely, Zoltán Szita.
Coach: István Csoknyai, Vladan Matić

Coaching history

Statistics

Records

Most matches played
Total number of matches played in official competitions only.

Last updated: 15 June 2019Source: kezitortenelem.hu

Most goals scored
Total number of goals scored in official matches only.

Last updated: 15 June 2019Source: kezitortenelem.hu

Record against other teams
As of 25 January 2021 

* includes games against  Serbia and Montenegro

Kit suppliers
Hungary's kits have been supplied by Adidas.

References

External links

IHF profile

Men's national handball teams
Handball in Hungary
National sports teams of Hungary